The 1979 Dissolution Honours List was issued in June 1979 following the general election of that year.

The recipients of honours are displayed as they were styled before their new honour.

Life Peers (all Labour)

Baroness
 Lena May Jeger, lately Member of Parliament for Camden, Holborn and St. Pancras South.

Baron
 John Edward Brooks, Chairman of the  Labour Party, Wales; former Leader of the Labour Group, County of South Glamorgan
 Sir Myer Galpern, lately Member of Parliament for Glasgow Shettleston; lately First Deputy  Chairman of Ways and Means, House of Commons.
 Rt Hon. Cledwyn Hughes , lately Member of Parliament for Anglesey. Secretary of State for Wales 1966–1968; Minister of Agriculture, Fisheries and Food 1968–1970.
 Rt Hon. Sydney Irving, lately Member of Parliament for Dartford. Chairman of Ways and Means, House of Commons 1968-70
 Rt Hon. Norman Harold Lever , Member of Parliament for Manchester Central; lately Chancellor of the Duchy of Lancaster
 Rt Hon. William Ross , lately Member of Parliament for Kilmarnock. Formerly Secretary of State for Scotland.
 Rt Hon. Robert Maitland Michael Stewart , lately Member of Parliament for Fulham. Formerly Secretary of State for Foreign and Commonwealth Affairs.
 Rt Hon. George Russell Strauss, lately Member of Parliament for Vauxhall. Minister of Supply 1947-51
 Henry Reginall Underhill , National Agent of the Labour Party

Privy Councillor
The Queen appointed the following to Her Majesty's Most Honourable Privy Council:

 Ernest Armstrong , Member of Parliament for the North West Durham. Lately Parliamentary Under-Secretary of State, Department of the Environment
 Jack Ashley , Member of Parliament for the Stoke-on-Trent South
 Trevor Alec Jones  , Member of Parliament for Rhondda. Lately Parliamentary Under-Secretary of State, Welsh Office
 Gordon James Oakes  , Member of Parliament for Widnes. Lately Minister of State, Department of Education and Science
 Harold Walker  , Member of Parliament for Doncaster. Lately Minister of State, Department of Employment

Knight Bachelor

 Frank Herbert Barlow , Secretary, Parliamentary Labour Party
 John McFarlane Boyd , General Secretary, Amalgamated Union of Engineering Workers
 Montague Bernard Levine, Personal Physician to the Rt Hon. James Callaghan 
 Thomas Daniel McCaffrey, Formerly Chief Press Secretary, 10 Downing Street 
 Joseph Percival William Mallalieu, lately Member of Parliament for the East Division of Huddersfield East. Minister of Defence (Royal Navy) 1966–1967. Minister of State, Board of Trade, 1967–1968. Minister of Technology 1968–1969.
 Thomas Gwilym Morris , Chief Constable, South Wales Constabulary
 Raphael Herman Tuck, lately Member of Parliament for Watford

Members of the Order of the Companions of Honour (CH)  
 Rt Hon. Denis Winston Healey , Member of Parliament for the Leeds East. Lately Chancellor of the Exchequer.

The Most Excellent Order of the British Empire

Dame Commander of the Order of the British Empire (DBE)

 Rt Hon. Judith Constance Mary Hart  , Member of Parliament for Lanark. Lately Minister for Overseas Development.

Commander of the Order of the British Empire (CBE)

 Donald Richard Coleman , Member of Parliament for Neath. Lately Vice-Chamberlain of the Household.
 Gordon Kenneth Dennis, Farmer, Lewes, Sussex
 Derek Oliver Gladwin , Regional Secretary, Southern Region, General and Municipal Workers Union
 James Hamilton  , Member of Parliament for the Bothwell Division of Lanarkshire. Lately Comptroller of the Household
 John Emrys Jones, Secretary/Organiser, Labour Party, Wales
 Ruth Margaret Sharpe , Private and Constituency Secretary to the Rt Hon. James Callaghan 
 Roger Stott  , Member of Parliament for the Westhoughton. Lately Parliamentary Private Secretary
 Derek Adrian Webster, Chairman,  Scottish Daily Record and Sunday Mail Ltd.
 Nigel Leonard Wicks, Formerly Private Secretary, Prime Minister's Office, 10 Downing Street

Officer of the Order of the British Empire (OBE)

 Gavyn Davies, Policy Adviser to the Rt Hon. James Callaghan 
 David John Wise, National Secretary, Co-operative Party
 Philip Wood, Formerly Private Secretary, Prime Minister's Office, 10 Downing Street

Member of the Order of the British Empire (MBE)
 Margaret Dougan, Private Secretary to Members of Parliament
 David Evans, Chairman, Cardiff South East Labour Party
 John David Fletcher Holt, Formerly Private Secretary, Prime Minister's Office, 10 Downing Street
 Albert Henry Long, Chief Clerk Superintendent, Whips Office, House of Commons
 Peter Ronald McClellan Taylor , Office Manager, Prime Minister's Office, 10 Downing  Street
 Eva Florence Thomas, Secretary, Ely Labour Party, Cardiff
 Annabel Urquhart, Assistant Scottish Organiser, Labour Party, Scotland
 John Bretnall Warwicker, Superintendent, Metropolitan Police

British Empire Medal (BEM)

Civil Division
 Charles Edward Barton, Messenger, Prime Minister's Office, 10 Downing Street
 Pamela Broughton, Telephonist, Prime Minister's Office, 10 Downing Street
 Joseph Robert Hazard, Driver to the Rt Hon. James Callaghan 
 Colin Brian Holden, the Chef at Chequers
 Daisy Elizabeth Riley, Cleaner, Prime Minister's Office, 10 Downing Street
 Wren Dorothy Woodcock, Stewardess at Chequers

References

1979 in the United Kingdom
Dissolution Honours
1979 awards